Olivia Mellan, (born October 14, 1946) is an American therapist and consultant, specialized in money conflict resolution. Since 1982, she has been a leader in the field of money psychology.  She is the author or co-author (with Sherry Christie) of five books about money and relationships. She is also a monthly columnist for Investment Advisor magazine.  She has been interviewed frequently on The TODAY Show, Oprah, and ABC's 20-20, as well as on nationwide TV, radio and in the print media.  In 2006, Investment Advisor magazine named her one of the Top 25 – those leaders who had the most influence on the financial advisor industry.

Early life and education
Olivia Mellan was born on October 14, 1946 in Brooklyn, New York, to Eli Mellan, an attorney (and later District Court Judge in Nassau County, New York), and Sara Mellan, a secretary and housewife. She was raised in Wantagh, Long Island.  Mellan was salutatorian of her MacArthur High School graduating class, and won a full scholarship to attend Mt. Holyoke College.  She graduated with honors in 1968 magna cum laude with a degree in French.  She studied in Paris, France, and choreographed plays in Paris and in America.  She attended Georgetown University's School of Language and Linguistics (also winning a full scholarship there); and earned a Masters in French, minoring in Sociolinguistics, in 1972.  Mellan studied for six years in training institutes to become a psychotherapist.  She studied Feminist Therapy for three years at the Washington Women's Center Feminist Counseling program, and graduated in 1974 from the Washington Community Therapy Guild's 3-year training program in Washington, D.C.

Early career
Olivia Mellan has been in private practice since 1974 as a psychotherapist specializing in women's issues and in couples conflict resolution.  Since 1982, she began specializing in money psychology and money conflict resolution, when she and attorney and friend Michael Goldberg, realized that "money was the last taboo in the therapy office and in life in general." They coined the term "money harmony" and offered a workshop at Sevenoaks Retreat Center in Madison, Va., leading a money psychology group at a Money Conference where Michael Phillips was the keynoter. Impressed by their work, Phillips sponsored a trip to California for Goldberg and Mellan to train other therapists in money psychology work.

An article in the Washington Post's Style section about "Money Madness" appearing around the Christmas season mentioned Mellan (under her previous married name - Mundra) and Goldberg's money personality types.  This led to many radio and print interviews, and several years later, Mellan self-published a workbook, Ten Days to Money Harmony.  This book came to the attention of George Gibson, head of Walker Publishing in New York City, who invited Mellan to expand her workbook into her first published book.

Money psychology work
Since 1983, Mellan's private practice expanded to include money-related issues for both individuals and couples.  By the 1990s, over half of her practice was money-related.  She taught Money Harmony courses at the Washington Ethical Society (for both individuals and couples), and after a financial planner (John Cammack) took one of her workshops, he invited her to speak to local and national financial advisor groups about money and relationships.  Mellan developed a specialty in gender differences around money, and couples polarization patterns and money, and began presenting workshops to therapist groups as well (at the Family Therapy Networker Symposium, now the Psychotherapy Networker Symposium, where she spoke almost yearly,) among others.

Writing  and bibliography
Select Investment Advisor Columns
 Resolving Conflict: Eight Steps to Workplace Harmony
 A Willful Purpose
 Cover Story, Reassessing Risk

Books
 Money Harmony: Resolving Money Conflicts In Your Life and Relationships. Walker & Company (1994).
 Money Shy to Money Sure: A Woman's Road Map to Financial Well-being. Walker & Company (2001).
 Your Money Style: The Nine Attitudes to Money and How They Affect Happiness, Love, Work and Family. Fine Communications (2001).
 Overspending: A Winning Plan for Spenders and their Partners (with Sherry Christie).  Money Harmony Books 2009). 
 The Client Connection: Helping Advisors Build Bridges that Last (with Sherry Christie). The National Underwriter Company (2009).

Chapters in other books
Mellan had a chapter on "Overcoming Overspending" in April Benson's book: To Buy or Not to Buy: Compulsive Shopping and the Search for Self. (year): In 2008, Mellan's chapter on "Money Harmony" appeared in Peak Vitality: Raising the Threshold of Abundance in Our Material, Spiritual, and Emotional Lives, edited by Jeanne House. In 2009, Mellan's chapter on "Money Harmony" appeared in Breaking Through: Getting Past the Stuck Points in Your Life, edited by Barbara Stanny, an anthology of inspiring essays from over 60 expert coaches, financial advisors, therapists, and other professionals. 

Also in 2009, the Love Book: The Top 50 Most Trusted Experts Reveal Their Secrets for Relationship Success by Scott Braxton, features a chapter by Mellan on "Moving toward Money Harmony" (and also features Dr. Phil, Harriet Lerner, Pat Love, John Gray, Tony Robins, Dr. Ruth, and Dr. Laura.)

Television and radio
Mellan has appeared frequently on The TODAY Show, on Oprah, and on ABC's 20-20.  She hosted her own radio show in Philadelphia, "Money Harmony with Olivia Mellan", on WWDB-AM, the Valley's only "money talk radio station", in 2007.  Her video, In the Prime: Couples and Money with Olivia Mellan, stems from her appearance on the PBS series, "In the Prime."  She has been interviewed on Marketplace; on NPR; and across the country on radio and local TV.  She has appeared several times on Kelvin Boston's PBS Series "Moneywise."

Citations and Notes

Living people
American financial writers
1946 births